The 2019 Categoría Primera A season (officially known as the 2019 Liga Águila season for sponsorship reasons) was the 72nd season of Colombia's top-flight football league. The season began on 25 January and concluded on 7 December. Junior entered the season as defending champions having won the 2018 Finalización tournament and successfully defended the title in the Torneo Apertura, beating Deportivo Pasto 5–4 on penalties after a 1–1 draw on aggregate to claim their ninth domestic league title on 12 June. Junior's winning streak was stopped in the Torneo Finalización by América de Cali, who won their fourteenth Primera A title and first since 2008 on 7 December by defeating the defending champions 2–0 on aggregate in the finals.

Format 
For this season, the league was played as follows:

 Two tournaments per year, with three stages each. The first stage was contested on a single round-robin basis, with each team playing the other teams once plus an additional match against a regional rival for a total of 20 games. The regional derby matchday in the first stage of both tournaments, which was not played in the previous season, returned for this season. 
 The knockout round was replaced by a semifinal stage to be played by the top eight teams after the end of the first stage, which were split into two groups of four with each team playing the others in their group twice. The top two teams from the first stage were seeded in each group, whilst the remaining six teams were drawn into each group.
 The finals were contested by the winners of each semifinal group, playing a double-legged series for the championship.
 The distribution of international qualification berths as well as the relegation system were the same as last season.

Teams 
20 teams competed, eighteen of them returning from last season plus Cúcuta Deportivo and Unión Magdalena, who were promoted from the 2018 Primera B. Both promoted teams replaced Boyacá Chicó and Leones who were relegated at the end of the previous season.

Stadia and locations 

a: Deportes Tolima played their Torneo Apertura home match against Rionegro Águilas at Estadio Metropolitano de Techo in Bogotá due to maintenance works at their regular stadium Estadio Manuel Murillo Toro.b: Deportivo Pasto will temporarily play their home matches at Estadio Municipal de Ipiales in Ipiales due to remodeling works at Estadio Departamental Libertad.

Managerial changes

Torneo Apertura

First stage
The First stage began on 25 January and consisted of twenty rounds with teams playing each other once plus an extra match against their regional rival. It ended on 5 May with the top eight teams at the end of this stage advancing to the semifinals.

Standings

Results

Semifinals
The eight teams that advanced to the semifinals were drawn into two groups of four teams. The winners of each group advanced to the finals.

Group A

Group B

Finals

Tied 1–1 on aggregate, Junior won on penalties.

Top goalscorers

Source: Soccerway

Torneo Finalización

First stage
The First stage began on 13 July and will feature the same format used in the Torneo Apertura, with reversed fixtures. It ended on 29 October with the top eight teams at the end of this stage advancing to the semifinals.

Standings

Results

Semifinals
The eight teams that advanced to the semifinals were drawn into two groups of four teams. The winners of each group advanced to the finals.

Group A

Group B

Finals
This final series featured the use of VAR for the first time in Colombian domestic football.

América de Cali won 2–0 on aggregate.

Top goalscorers

Source: Soccerway

Aggregate table

Relegation
A separate table is kept to determine the teams that get relegated to the Categoría Primera B for the next season. This table is elaborated from a sum of all first stage games played for the current season and the previous two seasons. For purposes of elaborating the table, promoted teams are given the same point and goal tallies as the team in the 18th position at the start of the season.

Source: DimayorRules for classification: 1st points; 2nd goal difference; 3rd goals scored; 4th away goals scored.

See also
 2019 Categoría Primera B season
 2019 Copa Colombia

References

External links 
 Dimayor's official website 

Categoría Primera A seasons
Colombia
1